U.S. Imperia 1923 S.r.l. was an Italian football club based in Imperia, Liguria. A.S.D. Imperia, based on the same city, being the major team of Imperia since 2008.

History
U.S. Imperia 1923 had covered 85 years of the football from the club .  In 2000 Imperia Calcio was bankrupted, which U.S. Imperia 1923 acquired the sports title from the administrator in 2000. In 2007–08 Serie D the club was bankrupted again, which a minor team from the same province, Pro Imperia, became the main football team of the city.

In November 2017, the prosecutor had requested to jail former chairman of the board of the football club, Gianfranco Montali for a 3-year sentence. On 2 November the Court of Imperia accepted the request and sentenced Montali.

Gianfranco Montali and his son Alessandro were already banned from football activities for a year due to irregularities in club management in October 2008.

Colors and badge
The team's colors were black and blue and its symbol was the dragon.

Honours
Serie D
Winner 1: 1998–99
Eccellenza
Winner 1: 2005–06
 Regional Coppa Italia Liguria:
Winners 1: 2005–06

References

 
Defunct football clubs in Italy
Football clubs in Liguria
Imperia
Serie C clubs
Association football clubs established in 2000
Association football clubs disestablished in 2008
2000 establishments in Italy
2008 disestablishments in Italy

it:Associazione Sportiva Dilettantistica Imperia